Margaret Rhodes  (9 June 1925 – 25 November 2016) was a British aristocrat and a first cousin of Queen Elizabeth II and Princess Margaret, Countess of Snowdon. From 1991 to 2002, she served as Woman of the Bedchamber to her aunt Queen Elizabeth The Queen Mother.

Early life and education
Born Margaret Elphinstone in Westminster, London, Rhodes was the youngest daughter of the 16th Lord Elphinstone and his wife, Lady Mary Bowes-Lyon, an elder sister of Queen Elizabeth The Queen Mother. Her uncle-in-law King George VI was her godfather. Less than a year older than her cousin Elizabeth, she was a frequent playmate of the future Queen. During the Second World War she lived at Windsor Castle and Buckingham Palace, and took a secretarial course. On 20 November 1947, she was a bridesmaid to Princess Elizabeth at her wedding to Philip Mountbatten, Duke of Edinburgh.

Career
During World War II, she worked as a secretary for MI6. She was a Woman of the Bedchamber – a mix of lady-in-waiting and companion – to her aunt, Queen Elizabeth The Queen Mother, from 1991 until the latter's death in 2002.

In the 2000 Birthday Honours Rhodes was appointed Lieutenant of the Royal Victorian Order (LVO). She lived in the Garden House, a grace and favour residence in Windsor Great Park. In the run-up to the Queen's 80th birthday in April 2006, Rhodes gave an interview to the BBC in which she stated her belief that the Queen would not abdicate.

Her autobiography, The Final Curtsey, was published in 2011. She was the castaway on BBC Radio 4's Desert Island Discs on 3 June 2012.

Rhodes appeared in seven documentaries about her first cousin Queen Elizabeth II.

On 27 November 2016, Buckingham Palace confirmed that Rhodes had died, aged 91, on 25 November following a short illness. The Queen and the Duke of Edinburgh attended her funeral in the Royal Chapel of All Saints, Windsor Great Park, on 12 December 2016, accompanied by the Duke of York, the Earl and Countess of Wessex, the Duke and Duchess of Gloucester, and Princess Alexandra, The Hon. Lady Ogilvy.

Personal life
On 31 July 1950, she married the writer Denys Gravenor Rhodes (1919–1981), with Princess Margaret as one of the bridesmaids. The couple had four children and one grandson:

Annabel Margaret Rhodes (born 21 February 1952); she married Christopher James Downing Strickland-Skailes in 1978. They have one son. She remarried G. V. Charles Cope in 1986. Annabel was a goddaughter of the Duke of Edinburgh and served as a bridesmaid at the wedding of Princess Margaret.
Andrew James Downing Strickland-Skailes (born 1980)
Victoria Ann Rhodes (born 27 September 1953), a goddaughter of Queen Elizabeth II; married Nicholas Deans in 1974; remarried John Pryor in 1999.
Simon John Gravenor Rhodes (born 22 February 1957), a godson of Princess Margaret; married Susan Simon in 1983. Susan was appointed as an extra lady-in-waiting to Queen Elizabeth II in July 2017.
Michael Andrew Gravenor Rhodes (born 8 June 1960)

References

1925 births
2016 deaths
People from Westminster
Daughters of barons
English autobiographers
English people of Scottish descent
English people of Dutch descent
Lieutenants of the Royal Victorian Order
De Peyster family
Schuyler family
Elphinstone family
Women of the Bedchamber
Moorhouse–Rhodes family